Tunrag  is a village in Chatra district of Jharkhand state of India.

References

Villages in Chatra district